Edgar Alonso Zapata Pérez (born September 1, 1979) is a Colombian football defender.

Zapata has had spells in Mexico and has been capped by the Colombia national football team once.

References

1979 births
Living people
Colombian footballers
Footballers from Medellín
Alianza Petrolera players
Atlético Junior footballers
Club Necaxa footballers
C.D. Veracruz footballers
Deportivo Cali footballers
Atlético Nacional footballers
Uniautónoma F.C. footballers
Colombia international footballers
Colombian expatriate footballers
Expatriate footballers in Mexico
Categoría Primera A players
Liga MX players
Association football defenders